New Knoxville High School is a public high school in New Knoxville, Ohio.  It is the only high school in the New Knoxville Local School district.

Athletics
New Knoxville is a member of the Midwest Athletic Conference. Their mascot is the Ranger.

The Rangers are DIV IV in the state of Ohio and have only 6 Varsity sports for men and women. Men's sports include: Basketball, Baseball, Soccer, Cross Country, Track and Field, and Golf. Women's include: Basketball, Volleyball, Track and Field, Cheerleading, Soccer, and Cross Country. The Ranger's men's basketball program was regarded as one of the best in the state of Ohio during the 2007, 2008, and 2009 seasons. The team saw success, tallying a combined record of 75–2 over the three seasons. New Knoxville won their first ever state championship in any sport when the Boys' basketball team beat Worthington Christian 74–52 on March 15, 2008, while remaining undefeated.

Ohio High School Athletic Association State Championships

 Boys Basketball – 2008
 Girls Volleyball - 2021

Ohio High School Athletic Association State Runners-Up
 Boys Basketball - 1947
 Girls Basketball – 2007
 Volleyball - 2006

Ohio High School Athletic Association State Final Fours
 Girls Track and Field - 2001, 2002
 Volleyball - 1989

External links
 District Website

Notes and references

High schools in Auglaize County, Ohio
Public high schools in Ohio
1938 establishments in Ohio
Educational institutions established in 1938